Roksana Bahramitash (born 1956) is an Iranian-born Canadian sociologist, author, and professor. Her work focuses on women, employment and the informal economy in the Middle East and North Africa (MENA), as well as gender segregation in Islam, and microeconomics. In post-revolution Iran, Bahramitash was working on improving peasant women's literacy and access to economic development resources.

Early life and education 
She was placed second in nationwide Iranian University entrance exams, and attended Universities in Iran where she earned both her Bachelor's and Master's degrees in Sociology. Bahramitash came to Canada in 1991 to complete her PhD in Sociology from McGill University in Montreal, Quebec.

Bahramitash eventually settled in Montreal, Canada as a citizen, where she has done post-doctoral work at the Simone de Beauvoir Institute, Concordia University in Montreal and Simon Fraser University.

Career 
Bahramitash has held lecturing and research positions at McGill and Concordia Universities, and the University of Montreal. She is the producer of a documentary film entitled Beyond the Bourqa, a documentary film made about women's changing lives during the War in Afghanistan. A follow up film to Beyond the Bourqa was intended, however filming came to an abrupt end when a suicide bomb was detonated at a U.N. compound very near to where Bahramitash was staying and herself and her crew were forced to leave Afghanistan because of the heightened level of danger.

Bahramitash is the winner of the Aileen D. Ross award (2003–04) for her focus on women and poverty in the Middle East. Her post-doctoral research was selected by the Social Sciences and Humanities Research Council (SSHRC) as one of the three most distinguished research projects in Canada. 2006 she won a three-year research grant from the SSHRC for a project on Globalization, Islam and Women.  Bahramitash has worked as a researcher and/or consultant with s the Canadian International Development Agency (CIDA), the International Development Research Centre , and the United Nations Development Program ).

Her first book was Liberation from Liberalization: Gender and Globalization in Southeast Asia. This book has been translated into Persian and published by SAMT as a University textbook. Her recent books are entitled Veiled Employment: Islamism and the Political Economy of Women's Employment in Iran by Syracuse University Press (co-edited with Hadi S. Esfahani) 2011, and Gender in Contemporary Iran: Pushing the Boundaries by Routledge and which was co-edited with Eric Hooglund, 2011. She most recently served as a Director of Research at the University of Montreal

Publications 
This is a list of select publications by Bahramitash.

Books 
  Reprinted by Book for Change in 2008. Translated into Persian in print by SAMT (Iranian University Textbook Publishing House).

Book chapters

Journal articles

References 

Living people
Iranian emigrants to Canada
Iranian sociologists
Iranian women sociologists
Iranian women academics
McGill University alumni
Academic staff of McGill University
Academic staff of Concordia University
Academics from Montreal
Canadian women academics
Canadian sociologists
Academic staff of the Université de Montréal
Academic staff of Simon Fraser University
Canadian women sociologists
1956 births